Aino Regina Taube (11 July 1912 – 3 June 1990) was a Swedish film and theatre actress. She appeared in 50 films between 1931 and 1988.

Selected filmography
 Skipper's Love (1931)
 Students in Paris (1932)
 A Stolen Waltz (1932)
 Augusta's Little Misstep (1933)
 Fridolf in the Lion's Den (1933)
 Man's Way with Women (1934)
 Kanske en gentleman (1935)
 Walpurgis Night (1935)
 The Quartet That Split Up (1936)
 Raggen (1936)
 Sara Learns Manners (1937)
 Conflict (1937)
 Art for Art's Sake (1938)
 Only One Night (1939)
 They Staked Their Lives (1940)
 Life Goes On (1941)
 His Majesty Must Wait (1945)
The Key and the Ring (1947)
 Secrets of Women (1952)
 For the Sake of My Intemperate Youth (1952)
 Last Pair Out (1956)
 A Guest in His Own House (1957)
 The Touch (1971)
 Face to Face (1976)
 Friends (1988)

References

External links
 

1912 births
1990 deaths
People from Helsingør Municipality
Swedish film actresses
Eugene O'Neill Award winners
20th-century Swedish actresses